In quantum mechanics, the quantum revival 

is a periodic recurrence of the quantum wave function
from its original form during the time evolution either many times in space as the multiple scaled fractions
in the form of the initial wave function (fractional revival) or approximately or exactly to its original 
form from the beginning (full revival). The quantum wave function periodic in time exhibits therefore the full revival 
every period. The phenomenon of revivals is most readily observable for the wave functions being well localized wave packets at the beginning of the time evolution for example in the hydrogen atom. For Hydrogen, the fractional revivals show up 
as multiple angular Gaussian bumps around the circle drawn by the radial maximum of leading circular state component (that with the highest amplitude in the eigenstate expansion)  of the
original localized state  and the full revival as the original Gaussian
.
The full revivals are exact for the infinite quantum well, harmonic oscillator or the hydrogen atom, while for shorter times are approximate 
for the hydrogen atom and a lot of quantum systems.

The plot of  collapses and revivals of quantum oscillations of the JCM atomic inversion.

Example - arbitrary truncated wave function of the quantum system with rational energies

Consider a quantum system with the energies  and the eigenstates 

and let the energies  be the rational fractions of some constant 

Then the truncated (till  of states)  solution of the time dependent Schrödinger equation is

.

Let   be to lowest common multiple of all  and  greatest common divisor of all 

after the full revival time time

.

Especially once created by fields the Trojan wave packet in a
hydrogen atom exists without any external fields
stroboscopically and eternally repeating itself 
after sweeping almost the whole hypercube of quantum phases exactly every full revival time.

The striking consequence is that no finite-bit computer can propagate the numerical wave function accurately for the arbitrarily long 
time. If the processor number is n-bit long  floating point number then the number can be stored by the computer only with the finite accuracy after the comma and the energy is (up to 8 digits after the comma)  for example 2.34576893 = 234576893/100000000 and as the finite fraction it
is exactly rational and the full revival occurs for any wave function of any quantum system  after the time  which is its maximum exponent and so on that may not be true for all quantum systems or all stationary quantum systems undergo the full and exact revival numerically.

In the system with the rational energies i.e. where the quantum exact full revival exists its existence immediately proves the quantum Poincaré recurrence theorem and the time of the full quantum revival equals to the Poincaré recurrence time. 
While the rational numbers are dense in real numbers and the arbitrary function of 
the quantum number can be approximated arbitrarily exactly with Padé approximants with the 
coefficients of arbitrary decimal precision for the arbitrarily long time each quantum system therefore revives 
almost exactly. It also means that the Poincaré recurrence and the full revival is mathematically the same thing  and it is 
commonly accepted that the recurrence is called the full revival if it occurs after the reasonable and physically measurable time 
that is possible to be detected by the realistic apparatus and this happens due to a very special energy spectrum having a large basic energy 
spacing gap of which the energies are arbitrary (not necessarily harmonic) multiples.

References

Quantum mechanics